Pedal boat may refer to:
 Amphibious cycle, a pedal-powered vehicle capable of operation on both land and water
 Hydrocycle, a bicycle-like watercraft with pontoons or a hydrofoil for buoyancy, and pedals for propulsion
 Human-powered hydrofoil, a hydrofoil that can use pedals and various other means for propulsion
 Pedalo, or paddle boat, a human-powered watercraft that uses pedals to turn a paddle wheel

See also
 Human-powered watercraft